RadioNL (stylized as RADIONL) is a commercial Dutch radio station that was founded in October 2004 by Nico Silvius. The first broadcast was on 1 March 2005. The music on offer from the station consists mainly of Dutch music.

The station can be received through the ether and cable in Friesland, Groningen, Drenthe, Flevoland, Overijssel, Gelderland, North Holland and Dutch and Belgian Limburg. In addition, the station can also listen via a live stream on the internet.

In 2009, the Morgenstond program won the Gouden RadioRing, the audience award for best radio program of the Netherlands.

Top 30 All Time, presented by De Deurzakkers and De Sjonnies.

In 2015 RadioNL celebrates with the Mega Piraten Festijn their 10th anniversary in Nieuwleusen on Saturday June 13.

Programs
 Morgenstond, with Marcel de Vries & Notaris Mulder
 Het Feest der Herkenning, with Alfred Voogd
 Werken met wouda, with Taeke Wouda
 Op Volle Kracht, with Hessel Wijkstra
 Johan in de middag, with Johan Terpstra
 De Jan Paparazzi show, with Jan Paparazzi
 Radionl Top 30, with Jan Paparazzi
 RadioNL Cafe, with Erik Ferwerda
 Gezellige Zaterdag, with several RadioNL DJs
 Radionl nostalgie, with previously Hessel Wijkstra later DJs
 RadioNL Non-stop, exemption is the summer & winter tour
 RadioNL Zomertoer, with several RadioNL DJs
 Vroeg uit de veren, with Alfred Voogd
 Werk in Uitvoering, with Marcel de Vries
 Afslag 3-6, with Taeke Wouda
 Nederlandstalige Top 30, with Taeke Wouda
 Dag In Dag Uit, with Alfred Hof

External links
 Official website

References

Radio stations in the Netherlands